The 2001 UBS Open was a men's tennis tournament played on outdoor clay courts at the Roy Emerson Arena in Gstaad in Switzerland and was part of the International Series of the 2001 ATP Tour. It was the 56th edition of the tournament and ran from 9 July until 15 July 2001. Jiří Novák won the singles title.

Finals

Singles

 Jiří Novák defeated  Juan Carlos Ferrero 6–1, 6–7(5–7), 7–5
 It was Novák's 3rd title of the year and the 18th of his career.

Doubles

 Roger Federer /  Marat Safin defeated  Michael Hill /  Jeff Tarango 0–1 (Hill and Tarango retired)
 It was Federer's 3rd title of the year and the 3rd of his career. It was Safin's 1st title of the year and the 9th of his career.

External links
 Official website  
 Official website 
 Official website 
 ATP Tournament Profile

UBS Open
Swiss Open (tennis)
UBS Open
UBS Open